Newspapers made endorsements of candidates in the 2012 United States presidential election, as follows. The tables below also indicate which candidate each publication endorsed in the 2008 United States presidential election, where known.

Barack Obama
The following 158 newspapers endorsed Barack Obama for the 2012 presidential election:

Daily newspapers

Weekly newspapers

Magazines

College and university newspapers

Mitt Romney
The following 112 newspapers endorsed Mitt Romney for the 2012 presidential election:

Daily newspapers

Weekly/monthly newspapers

Magazines

Gary Johnson

The following newspapers endorsed Gary Johnson for the 2012 presidential election:

Daily newspapers

Weekly newspapers

Jill Stein

The following newspapers endorsed Jill Stein for the 2012 presidential election:

Weekly newspapers

College and university newspapers

No endorsement

Discontinued endorsing candidates 

Chicago Sun-Times—Endorsed Barack Obama in 2008.
Dayton Daily News—Endorsed Barack Obama in 2008.
Knoxville News Sentinel—Endorsed John McCain in 2008.
Milwaukee Journal Sentinel—Endorsed Barack Obama in 2008.
St. Paul Pioneer Press—Did not endorse in 2008.
The Tuscaloosa News—Endorsed Barack Obama in 2008.
Sarasota Herald-Tribune—Endorsed Barack Obama in 2008.
The Atlanta Journal-Constitution—Endorsed Barack Obama in 2008.

No endorsement in 2012 

Austin American-Statesman—Endorsed Barack Obama in 2008.
The Oregonian (Portland)—Endorsed Barack Obama in 2008.
The State Journal-Register (Springfield, Illinois)—Endorsed Barack Obama in 2008.
The Indianapolis Star—Did not endorse in 2008 either.
Times Record News (Wichita Falls)—Endorsed John McCain in 2008.
The Times-Picayune (New Orleans)—Endorsed Barack Obama in 2008.
The Palm Beach Post—Endorsed Barack Obama in 2008.
The Birmingham News—Endorsed John McCain in 2008.
The Bakersfield Californian—Endorsed John McCain in 2008.

Other 

The Post-Standard (Syracuse) -- Listed itself as "undecided" and criticized both candidates. Endorsed Barack Obama in 2008.

References

External links
Editor and Publisher compilation of endorsements
2012 General Election Editorial Endorsements by Major Newspapers, The American Presidency Project at the University of California, Santa Barbara

2012 United States presidential election endorsements
Newspaper endorsements
2012 in mass media
2010s politics-related lists